Prasophyllum hygrophilum, commonly known as the swamp leek orchid, is a species of orchid endemic to Victoria. It has a single tubular green leaf and up to thirty greenish brown, pink or mauve flowers. It is a rare orchid only known from two populations and is classified as "endangered" in Victoria.

Description
The flowers are greenish brown, pink or mauve and as with others in the genus, are inverted so that the labellum is above the column rather than below it. There is a broad, raised, tapering, greenish callus in the centre of the labellum. Flowering occurs from November to December.

Taxonomy and naming
Prasophyllum hygrophilum was first formally described in 2003 by David Jones and Dean Rouse. The description was published in Australian Orchid Research from a specimen collected from near Nagambie.

Distribution and habitat
This leek orchid grows in grassy woodland it two areas of north-central Victoria.

Conservation
Prasophyllum hygrophilum is listed as Endangered under the Victorian Flora and Fauna Guarantee Act 1988.

References

External links 
 

hygrophilum
Flora of Victoria (Australia)
Endemic orchids of Australia
Plants described in 2003